Winston Donley Anderson (November 10, 1909 – November 11, 1952) played for the New York Giants for one season in 1936. While on the team he wore the football jersey number 24. Born in Charleston, West Virginia, Anderson played college football for the Colgate Raiders. He died of a heart attack in Columbus, Ohio on November 11, 1952.

References

1909 births
1950 deaths
Sportspeople from Charleston, West Virginia
Players of American football from West Virginia
Colgate Raiders football players
New York Giants players